Opus Colors (stylized as Opus.COLORs) is an upcoming original Japanese anime television series created by Rin Hinata, animated by C-Station and produced by NBCUniversal Entertainment Japan. It is directed by Shunsuke Tada and written by Sayaka Harada, with Asami Watanabe designing the characters, and Ken Arai composing the music. It is scheduled to premiere on April 7, 2023, on Tokyo MX and BS11. The opening theme song is "Shiny" by Urashimasakatasen.

Characters

References

External links
 Anime official website 
 

2023 anime television series debuts
Anime with original screenplays
Art in anime and manga
C-Station
NBCUniversal Entertainment Japan
Upcoming anime television series
Tokyo MX original programming